Brochymena barberi is a species of stink bug in the family Pentatomidae. It is found in North America.

Subspecies
These two subspecies belong to the species Brochymena barberi:
 Brochymena barberi barberi Ruckes, 1939
 Brochymena barberi diluta Ruckes, 1939

References

Articles created by Qbugbot
Insects described in 1939
Halyini